
Gmina Puchaczów is a rural gmina (administrative district) in Łęczna County, Lublin Voivodeship, in eastern Poland.

The gmina contains part of the protected area called Łęczna Lake District Landscape Park.

Villages
Gmina Puchaczów contains the villages and settlements of Albertów, Bogdanka, Brzeziny, Ciechanki, Ciechanki-Kolonia, Jasieniec, Nadrybie Ukazowe, Nadrybie-Dwór, Nadrybie-Wieś, Ostrówek, Puchaczów, Stara Wieś, Szpica, Turowola, Turowola-Kolonia, Wesołówka and Zawadów.

Neighbouring gminas
Gmina Puchaczów is bordered by the gminas of Cyców, Łęczna, Ludwin, Milejów and Siedliszcze.

References

Polish official population figures 2006

Puchaczow
Łęczna County